Peter Arnold Lienhardt (12 March 1928 – 17 March 1986) was a British social anthropologist.

Life
Lienhardt was born in Bradford on 12 March 1928 to Godfrey Lienhardt and Jennie Liendhart ( Benn). He was educated at Batley Grammar School and, like his brother Godfrey Lienhardt, at Downing College, Cambridge, where he studied Arabic and Persian. After military service in the Royal Air Force he undertook post-graduate studies in social anthropology at Lincoln College, Oxford, earning a doctorate in 1957 with a thesis on "The Shaikhdoms of Eastern Arabia".

In the mid 1950s he carried out fieldwork in Persian Gulf countries for his doctorate, and as a senior research fellow at the East African Institute for Social Research at Makerere College, Uganda, he carried out fieldwork in Zanzibar in the late 1950s. He carried out further fieldwork in Iran in the mid 1960s.

Lienhardt was appointed to a faculty lectureship in Middle Eastern sociology at the Institute of Social Anthropology, University of Oxford. He died on 17 March 1986. In 1987 the British Society for Middle Eastern Studies published a volume in his honour, The Diversity of the Muslim Community: Anthropological Essays in Memory of Peter Lienhardt, edited by Ahmed Al-Shahi.

Work
Hasani Bin Ismail, The Medicine Man: Swifa Ya Nguvumali, edited and translated by Peter Lienhardt (Oxford Library of African Literature, Clarendon Press, Oxford, 1968).
Peter Lienhardt, Disorientations – A Society in Flux: Kuwait in the 1950s, edited by Ahmed AI-Shahi (Middle East Cultures Series 19; Reading, Ithaca Press, 1993).
Peter Lienhardt, Shaikhdoms of Eastern Arabia, edited by Ahmed AI-Shahi (Palgrave, 2001).

References

1928 births
1986 deaths
Alumni of Downing College, Cambridge
Alumni of Lincoln College, Oxford
Academics of the University of Oxford
British anthropologists
Writers from Bradford
Social anthropologists
20th-century anthropologists